Events from the year 1989 in Croatia.

Incumbents
President of Presidency - Ivo Latin
Chairman of the Executive Council - Antun Milović

Events
The Croatian musical group Riva won the Eurovision Song Contest 1989.

Arts and literature

Sport
Davor Šuker was the highest scoring player in Yugoslavia's First Federal League, with 18 goals for NK Osijek.
RK Zagreb was champion of Yugoslavia in handball.
Dražen Petrović, Toni Kukoč, Dino Rađa, Stojko Vranković, Zoran Čutura, Zdravko Radulović were members of the Yugoslavian team which won EuroBasket 1989.
HAVK Mladost became champion of Yugoslavia in water polo.

Births
 29 April - Domagoj Vida, footballer
 3 June - Martina Zubčić, taekwondo athlete
 5 July - Dejan Lovren, footballer

Deaths
15 April - Ante Kaštelančić, painter (born 1911)
24 April - Dinko Štambak, historian (born 1912)
4 October - Lavoslav Horvat, architect (born 1901)
9 November - Nenad Petrović, chess problemist (born 1907)
15 December - Vanja Sutlić, philosopher (born 1925)

References

 
Years of the 20th century in Croatia
Croatia